Tarsdorf is a municipality in the district of Braunau am Inn in the Austrian state Upper Austria.

Geography
Tarsdorf is located in the Innviertel. Situated at an altitude of 429 metres (1,407 ft), the municipality covers an area of 32.2 km² (12.4 mi²), measuring 7.1 km (4.4 mi) from north to south and 6.8 km (4.2 mi) from east to west. 37.9% of the land is forested, while 54.7% is used for agriculture. The Filzmoos, a raised bog, is located within the municipality.

Villages
The villages in the municipity are (with population in brackets as at 1 Jan 2020):

 Am Anger (69)
 Döstling (50)
 Eckldorf 57
 Ehersdorf (203)
 Eichbichl (83)
 Fugging (106)
 Haid (48)
 Hofstadt (89)
 Hofweiden (124)
 Hörndl (243)
 Hucking (59)
 Leithen (76)
 Neues Dorf (82)
 Ölling (18)
 Schmidham (38)
 Sensberg (53)
 Sinzing (4)
 Staig (28)
 Tarsdorf (481)
 Wimm (1)
 Winham (52)
 Wolfing (45)
 Wupping (51)

History
Finds in the Weilhart Forest indicate that the Tarsdorf area had already been settled by the Neolithic. Burial mounds from the Hallstatt period have been discovered. The area was settled by Celts around 500 BCE. 

In the Roman era, the road from Salzburg to Burghausen led through Tarsdorf. It ran through Hofweiden, Tarsdorf and Hörndl. The remains of a rustic villa, a millstone, shards of bowls, bricks from an underfloor heating system, pieces of plaster and a silver coin, all dating back to the first four centuries CE, have been discovered between Hofweiden and Tarsdorf.

In the sixth centuries the immigrating Bajuwars, ancestors of today's Bavarians, cleared large parts of the Weilhart-forest.

Population Development

Notable People
- Richard Puchner (1883-1965), architect and builder

- Georg Dechant (1884-1953), politician, farmer and landlord

References

External links

Cities and towns in Braunau am Inn District